The Brave Don't Cry is a 1952 British drama film directed by Philip Leacock and starring John Gregson, Meg Buchanan and John Rae. The film depicts the events of September 1950 at the Knockshinnoch Castle colliery in Scotland, where 129 men were trapped by a landslide (see Knockshinnoch Disaster September 1950). It was shot at Southall Studios and was also known by the alternative title Knockshinnoch Story. The filmmakers used actors from the Glasgow Citizens Theatre. It was screened at the Venice Film Festival in September 1952.

Plot

A group of coalminers are trapped underground after a fall.

The story follows the trapped men, their rescuers, and their families as they struggle to dig them out before the oxygen is exhausted.

A phone line exists to the trapped men.

The efforts are hampered by firedamp.

Cast
 John Gregson as Dr John Cameron
 Meg Buchanan as Margaret Wishart
 John Rae as Donald Sloan
 Fulton Mackay as Dan Wishart
 Andrew Keir as Charlie Ross
 Wendy Noel as Jean Knox
 Russell Waters as  Hughie Aitken
 Jameson Clark as Doctor Andrew Kerr
 Eric Woodburn as Rab Elliott
 Archie Duncan as Walter Hardie
 Jack Stewart as Willie Duncan
 Anne Butchart as Biddy Ross
 Mac Picton as Jim Knox
 Jean Anderson as Mrs. Sloan
 John Singer as Tam Stewart
Russell Hunter as Police Sergeant
Sam Kydd as Porter

Production
It was originally known as What God Forgot. John Grierson head of Group 3 called the script "one of the most moving I have read for years".

Critical reception
In a contemporary review, The Monthly Film Bulletin wrote, "in its semi-documentary, semi-impersonal way The Brave Don't Cry is an estimable achievement, effectively sustaining the dramatic tension and sketching its characters with directness and a refreshing absence of mannerisms. Its limitations are the limitations of its genre - dramatic reportage rather than personal statement, observation without passion.
The method works very well for many of the scenes, but the more emotional moments tend to seem either theatrical or (as in the case of Mrs. Sloan's reunion with her husband) conventionally understated. In its genre, though, the film stands quite high, and it gains greatly from the use of unfamiliar players. There are particularly good performances from Fulton Mackay, Jameson Clark, Jean Anderson and John Rae; and the folk song used over the credits and at the end - there is no background music - is highly effective."

References

Bibliography
 Harper, Sue & Porter, Vincent. British Cinema of the 1950s: The Decline of Deference. Oxford University Press, 2007.

External links

1952 films
1952 drama films
1950s English-language films
Films directed by Philip Leacock
Films shot at Southall Studios
British drama films
British black-and-white films
Films set in Scotland
Films about mining
1950s British films